Smederevska Palanka Airport ( / Aerodrom Smederevska Palanka) , also locally known as Rudine Airport ( / Aerodrom Rudine), is an airport that serves the town of Smederevska Palanka. The airport has a grass runway that is 700 m long and 30 m wide.

See also 
 List of airports in Serbia
 Transport in Serbia
 AirSerbia

External links 
Smederevska Palanka airport information (PDF)
Smederevska Palanka airport pictures

Airports in Serbia